The Bluff, Queensland, Australia, may refer to:

 The Bluff, Queensland (Ipswich), a suburb in City of Ipswich
 The Bluff, Queensland (Toowoomba Region), a locality in the Toowoomba Region

See also
 Bluff, Queensland, a town